Drusiliana was a civitas (town) of Roman North Africa.
Bingham called it a city of the Roman province of Mauretania Caesariensis. An inscription of Constantine the Great was found in the city ruins and it appears on the Tabula Peutingeriana 
The town has been tentatively identified with ruins near Khanguet-el-Kdim in northern Algeria.
Epigraphical evidence suggest Constantine the Great undertook some works in the city in 312AD.

The town was also the seat of an ancient Christian bishopric, suffragan to Archdiocese of Carthage. This Bishopric is only known for the presence of bishops at the Council of Carthage (411), which saw gathered together Catholic bishops and Donatists of Africa: the Catholic side was represented by Rufino, while the Donatist by Restitutus.

The bishopric survives today as a titular see of the Roman Catholic Church. The current bishop is Yosyf Milyan of Kyiv.

Known bishops 
Rufino (mentioned in 411) 
 Restitutus (mentioned in 411) (Bishop Donatist)
 Joseph Klemann (South West Africa) February 24, 1931 March 21, 1960
 José María Cirarda Lachiondo (Spain) 9 April 1960 July 22, 1968
 Fernando Errázuriz Gandarillas (José Ismael Errázuriz Gandarillas) (Chile) 31 January 1969 31 August 1973
 Aurélio Granada Escudeiro (Azores) 18 March 1974 30 June 1979
 Affonso Felippe Gregory (Brazil) 2 August 1979 16 July 1987
 Horácio Coelho Cristino  (Portugal) 20 August 1987 8 May 1995
 Giuseppe Merisi (Italy) 8 September 1995 14 November 2005
 Yosyf Milyan (Ukraine) 16 April 2009

References

Catholic titular sees in Africa
Former Roman Catholic dioceses in Africa
Roman towns and cities in Tunisia